Glenn Hetrick is a special make-up effects artist/designer, actor and producer. Hetrick is CEO of Alchemy FX Studios, a special effects studio which has worked on over 100 film and TV credits, such as Star Trek: Discovery, Hunger Games, Marvel's Agents of S.H.I.E.L.D, and Mad Men. His extensive work in film and television is shown by his nominations for nine awards.

Early life 
Hetrick was born in Hellertown, Pennsylvania.  He attended Saucon Valley High School where developed his love for acting when he was chosen to play the villain Bill Sikes in the musical "Oliver". He earned a Public Relations and Promotions Degree from York College of Pennsylvania where he was a member of Tau Kappa Epsilon.

Career
Hetrick’s professional career began when he wrote, produced, and designed the makeups for the music video, Scream! for the horror/heavy metal rock band, The Misfits, with director George A. Romero directing. In 2000, Hetrick moved to Los Angeles to expand his professional goals where he landed a job at Optic Nerve Studios, working on such shows as Buffy the Vampire Slayer, X-Files and Crossing Jordan. He later appeared in acting roles on Charmed, Scrubs, and Heroes. Hetrick now owns Alchemy Studios which is known for such shows like The Hunger Games, Mad Men, and CSI: New York. In 2012 Hetrick served as the lead judge on all thirteen seasons of the Syfy original series Face Off, which features makeup artists competing for $100,000. Hetrick has been nominated for three Primetime Emmy Awards. In 2019, Hetrick won the Primetime Emmy Award for Outstanding Prosthetic Makeup for a Series, Limited Series, Movie or Special for his work on Star Trek: Discovery.

In 2021, it was announced Hetrick is producing and adapting the 1980s horror cult novel series Necroscope with production company Revelations Entertainment founded by Morgan Freeman.

References

External links
 

Living people
1972 births
American make-up artists
People from Northampton County, Pennsylvania
Saucon Valley High School alumni
Special effects people